Neoptilia is a genus of argid sawflies in the family Argidae. There are at least two described species in Neoptilia.

Species
These two species belong to the genus Neoptilia:
 Neoptilia malvacearum Cockerell, 1894 b (hollyhock sawfly)
 Neoptilia tora Smith, 1971 b (purple sawfly)
Data sources: i = ITIS, c = Catalogue of Life, g = GBIF, b = Bugguide.net

References

Further reading

External links

 

Argidae
Hymenoptera genera